Clarington is a city in Ontario, Canada.

Clarington may also refer to:
Clarington, Ohio, United States
Clarington, Pennsylvania, United States